The 17th Regiment of Light Dragoons was a cavalry regiment of the British Army raised in 1759 and disbanded in 1763.

It was raised in Scotland by Captain Lord Aberdour in 1759, for service in the Seven Years' War, and disbanded following the Treaty of Paris in 1763.

References

Cavalry regiments of the British Army
Dragoons
Dragoon regiments of the British Army
Light Dragoons
Military units and formations established in 1759
Military units and formations disestablished in 1763
1759 establishments in Great Britain